Personal is an Argentine telecommunications company which provides Internet and mobile telephony services throughout the country. A subsidiary of Telecom, it started as a mobile service provider from its foundation in 1995 until 2021 when it absorbed Telecom's Fibertel and Cablevisión subsidiaries, combining both broadband and mobile internet services under one brand. Personal is Argentina's second-largest mobile phone service provider, after Telefonica's Movistar.

History 
Personal was launched in 1995 as the mobile phone brand for parent company Telecom, and provided mobile services in the northern part of the country (where its parent company also provided fixed telephony services). In the metropolitan area of Buenos Aires, instead, Telecom provided mobile phone services since 1993 under the brand Miniphone, in a joint venture together with Telefónica. However, in 1999, legal provisions determine the division of Miniphone, as well as of all those companies whose shareholders were Telecom and Telefónica. It is from there that Telecom Personal also begins to provide service in Greater Buenos Aires independently (keeping part of the clients of the divided Miniphone).

References

External links
 

Telecommunications companies established in 1995
Companies based in Buenos Aires
Telecommunications companies of Argentina
1995 establishments in Argentina
Internet service providers of Argentina
Argentine brands